This is a list of the longest rivers of the United Kingdom.

Longest rivers of the United Kingdom

There seems to be little consensus in published sources as to the lengths of rivers, nor much agreement as to what constitutes a river. Thus the River Ure and River Ouse can be counted as one river system or as two rivers. Also, the Thames tributary, the River Churn, sourced at Seven Springs, adds  to the length of the Thames (from its traditional source at Thames Head). Thus, the combined Churn/Thames river would top the list. Sue Owen et al., in their book on rivers, generally restrict the length to the parts that bear the same name. Many of the above lengths are considerably different from Sue Owen's list, some longer and some shorter.

Where a river ends in an estuary the conventional British approach has been to treat the river as ending at the end of the administrative zone. Thus the Severn ends at the mouth of the Bristol Avon and the Thames at the Yantlet Line. The currently accepted end of the Severn Estuary is about  further, and the Port of London's authority stretches now to Margate,  further. Other countries have different conventions, making comparisons of limited value. Those rivers which empty into other (non-tidal sections of) rivers are indicated in the table thus*. In Yorkshire, the Aire, Derwent and Don all empty into a tidal section of the Yorkshire Ouse.

The figures for mean flow are derived from those offered up by the National River Flow Archive, in particular the flow measured at the lowermost gauging stations on each named watercourse. Sometimes the figures of further downstream tributaries are combined with those of the main stem river to provide a more realistic flow figure for the lowermost non-tidal stretch of a watercourse. Some major UK rivers (in terms of flow) are omitted from the list above simply because they are also short.

See also

 List of rivers of England
 List of rivers of Ireland
 List of rivers of Scotland
 List of rivers of Wales
 List of rivers in the Isle of Man
 Terminology
 Estuary
 Firth
 Floodplain
 River
 River delta
 Source (river or stream)
 Tributary
 Canal & River Trust
 Canals of the United Kingdom
 Geography of the United Kingdom
 List of lakes in the United Kingdom
 Reservoirs and dams in the United Kingdom
 Waterfalls of the United Kingdom
 Waterways in the United Kingdom

References

 
United Kingdom

he:בריטניה הגדולה#נהרות